Bill Dixon in Italy Volume Two is an album by American jazz trumpeter Bill Dixon recorded in Milan in 1980 and released on the Italian Soul Note label. The album resulted after producer Giovanni Bonandrini was so impressed by Dixon's sextet he requested them to record two albums instead of the single one that was planned.

Reception

In his review for AllMusic, Ron Wynn stated "A rare date from a distinctive trumpeter whose approach, clarity of tone, and directness set him apart in the '60s."

The authors of The Penguin Guide to Jazz Recordings noted that the album is "very much in the [Cecil] Taylor line," and wrote: "Dixon doesn't feature himself that prominently, preferring to spread much of the higher voicing round the three-trumpet front line."

Track listing
All compositions by Bill Dixon
 "Sketch/Firenze" - 14:54
 "Summer Song Two: Evening" - 7:30	
 "Summer Song Three: Aurorea/Daybreak" - 3:20	
 "Dusk" - 2:36	
 "Dance Piece: Places/For Jack and Barbara/Autumn Sequences from a Paris Diary" - 12:50

Personnel
Bill Dixon - trumpet, piano
Arthur Brooks, Stephen Haynes - trumpet
Stephen Horenstein - tenor saxophone, baritone saxophone
Alan Silva - bass
Freddie Waits - drums

References 

1981 albums
Bill Dixon albums
Black Saint/Soul Note albums